The following is a summary of Down county football team's 2018 season.

Kits

Competitions

Dr McKenna Cup
The draw for the 2018 Dr McKenna Cup was made in November 2017.

Fixtures
Down's tie against the University of Ulster was postponed due to an unplayable pitch.

Table

National Football League Division 2

Down played in Division Two of the National Football League in 2018.

Fixtures
Fixtures for the 2018 National League were announced on 13 October 2017. Down's fifth fixture against Cavan was postponed due to 2018 Great Britain and Ireland cold wave. The game was re-scheduled for Saturday 10 March. Due to further snow in March the fixture against Tipperary on 18 March was also postponed.

Despite a victory on the final day of the campaign, Down were relegated to Division 3 following a win for Meath over Louth on the same day.

Table

Results

Ulster Senior Football Championship

The draw for the 2018 Ulster Senior Football Championship took place on 19 October 2017, with Down being drawn at home to Antrim in the quarter-final stage. Down progressed to the Ulster semi-finals but lost to Donegal in Clones on 10 June.

Fixtures

Bracket

Results

All-Ireland Senior Football Championship

Fixtures

Results

References

Down
Gaelic
Down county football team seasons